The Office of the President of the Republic of the Union of Myanmar is a ministry-level body that serves the President of Myanmar. Since the 2021 Myanmar coup d'état, the position has remained vacant.

Currently, the Office of the President was renamed as Office of the State Administration Council Chairman and led by permanent Secretary, Zaw Than Thin.

History
On 4 September 2012, the Pyidaungsu Hluttaw approved an expansion of the office from two ministries into six to improve efficiencies on ongoing peace processes, preparations for the 2013 Southeast Asian Games and Burma's hosting of the 2014 ASEAN Summit. On 9 January 2013 Thein Sein appointed deputy Minister of Information Ye Htut as his office's first official spokesperson. The responsibility had been previously handled by Zaw Htay, the office's director. The office has since been reduced to one ministry under President Htin Kyaw. After President Htin Kyaw, Win Myint served as the President of Myanmar.

From 2016 to 2021, the State Counsellor is Aung San Suu Kyi. She also served as Minister of Foreign Affairs. She played a vital role in Myanmar's transition from military junta to partial democracy in the 2010s and won the 2020 elections but on 1 February 2021, she was detained by the military during the 2021 Myanmar coup d'état.

After the coup, SAC renamed the office as the Office of the State Administration Council Chairman.

List of Ministers(2011-Present)

Presidential advisors (2011–2016)
Thein Sein has appointed several presidential advisory board during his term, including economics, legal, education, and religious affairs committees. A 9-member advisory board was appointed on 19 April 2011, under Notification No. 1/2011. On 18 June 2014, the team was expanded to include religious affairs advisors, led by Myint Maung and Sein Win Aung, a former ambassador who is the father-in-law of Thein Sein's daughter.

As of 2014, the advisory teams and leaders included:
 Political affairs: Ko Ko Hlaing
 Economic affairs: U Myint
 Legal affairs: Sit Aye
 Religious affairs: Myint Maung
 Education affairs: Yin Yin Nwe
 Health affairs: ?

Departments
Union Minister Office 
President Staff Office 
Vice President (1) Staff Office 
Vice President (2) Staff Office 
Politics and Security Department 
Economic Department 
Social and Culture Department 
Administraion and Finance Department 
Department of Houses 
Department of Chief Security Officer 
Research, Information and Complaints Department

Headquarters

The President and Vice Presidents seated at President Office located at Presidential Palace.The Ministry of President's Office which serve the President is located at Office No(18), Naypyitaw.The Ministry Office is co-opened with Ministry of Union Government Office. A new Ministry Office is under construction near the Union Supreme Court. Office No. 18 is the office building of the State Peace and Development Council and the Ministry of the Prime Minister's Office during the previous SPDC government.

References

External links
 Official website

Government ministries of Myanmar